Neeta Choudhary ( - 2 June 2019) was an Indian politician belonging to Janata Dal (United). She was elected as MLA of Tarapur in Bihar Legislative Assembly in 2010. Her husband Mewalal Choudhary was elected as MLA of Tarapur in 2015.

Neeta Choudhary and her husband Mewalal Choudhary suffered injuries in a gas cylinder explosion at their residence on 27 May 2019. She died on 2 June 2019 in Safdarjung Hospital, Delhi at the age of 50.

There were reports of conspiracy behind her death but nothing came out of it.

References

1960s births
2019 deaths
Janata Dal (United) politicians
Bihar MLAs 2010–2015
Women members of the Bihar Legislative Assembly
21st-century Indian women politicians